The canton of Pont-du-Château is an administrative division of the Puy-de-Dôme department, central France. Its borders were modified at the French canton reorganisation which came into effect in March 2015. Its seat is in Pont-du-Château.

It consists of the following communes:
Lempdes
Mur-sur-Allier
Pont-du-Château

References

Cantons of Puy-de-Dôme